Christien "Chris" Jermaine Charles (born February 23, 1981) is an American professional basketball player for Saigon Heat of the ASEAN Basketball League.

Professional career

During the 2013-2014 ASEAN Basketball League season, Charles led Hi-Tech Bangkok City to the championship while winning the Most Valuable Player award.

In December 2014, Charles was signed by the Blackwater Bossing of the Philippine Basketball Association as their import for the PBA Commissioner's Cup. However, a left hamstring injury prevented him from suiting up in the PBA. 

In 2016, Charles signed with the Saigon Heat for the 2016-17 ABL season.

In 2018, Charles signed with the Singapore Slingers for the 2017-18 ABL season.

In 2019, Charles was named to the ABL's Top 10 Players of All Time. At that time, Charles was a two-time MVP and three-time Defensive Player of the Year winner.

References

External links
Villanova Wildcats profile

1981 births
Living people
American expatriate basketball people in the Philippines
American expatriate basketball people in Thailand
American expatriate basketball people in Vietnam
American men's basketball players
Basketball players from Milwaukee
Blackwater Bossing players
Centers (basketball)
Philippine Basketball Association imports
Saigon Heat players
Villanova Wildcats men's basketball players